Back Cove is a small fishing village on Fogo Island, in the Fogo District. This place is separated from Fogo by a small neck of land. It had a population of 59 in 1956.

See also 
 List of communities in Newfoundland and Labrador

Populated coastal places in Canada
Populated places in Newfoundland and Labrador